Itahar Junction railway station is a railway junction in Uttar Dinajpur district, West Bengal. Its code is ITHAR. It is to serve Itahar town and is planned to be a junction on the new –– line with a link to  via Harirampur.

References

External links

Railway stations in Uttar Dinajpur district
Katihar railway division
Railway junction stations in West Bengal